L. Eugene Smith (September 3, 1921 – April 7, 2019) was a Republican member of the Pennsylvania House of Representatives.

References

Republican Party members of the Pennsylvania House of Representatives
2019 deaths
1921 births